The Miss New Mexico Teen USA competition is a pageant that selects the representative for the state of New Mexico in the broader Miss Teen USA pageant. It is directed by Laura's Productions based in El Paso, Texas.

New Mexico has seen six state teens place in the Miss Teen USA pageant with three of these placements occurring during the 1980s, which and made New Mexico one of the more successful states in that decade. Not a single New Mexico teen had placed from 1988 until Brittany Toll made the finals in 2005.

Five New Mexico teens have triumphed at the Miss New Mexico USA and compete at Miss USA. More unusually, two have also competed at Miss America. In 2003, former New Mexico teens held both the Miss New Mexico USA and Miss New Mexico (America) titles.

Caroline Babcock of Farmington, New Mexico is crowned Miss New Mexico Teen USA 2022 on June 5, 2022 at the New Mexico Farm and Ranch Heritage Museum in Las Cruces, New Mexico. She will now represent New Mexico for the title of Miss Teen USA 2022.

Results summary

Placements
Top 10: Cheryl Douds (1984), Carolee Hanson (1986), Jill Vasquez (1988), Brittany Toll (2005)
Top 15: Ximena Navarrete (2007)
Top 16: Jacqueline Cai (2012)
New Mexico holds a record of 6 placements at Miss Teen USA.

Awards
Best State Costume: Emily Lehr (2021; 2nd place)

Winners 

1 Age at the time of the Miss Teen USA pageant

References

New Mexico
Women in New Mexico